Kevin Scott MacDonald (born February 24, 1966) is a Canadian ice hockey coach and former professional ice hockey player.

With the exception of playing one game in the National Hockey League (NHL) with the Ottawa Senators during the 1993–94 NHL season, MacDonald played his entire career in the minor leagues. He played in the International Hockey League (IHL), American Hockey League (AHL), and East Coast Hockey League (ECHL).

Roller hockey
MacDonald played one game of professional roller hockey when he suited up for the Ottawa Loggers (RHI) in 1996.

Coaching
Following his playing career, MacDonald spent three seasons (1998–2001) as the head coach of the Bakersfield Condors in the WCHL.

Career statistics

Regular season and playoffs

See also
List of players who played only one game in the NHL

External links

1966 births
Living people
Baton Rouge Kingfish players
Canadian ice hockey coaches
Canadian ice hockey defencemen
Chicago Wolves players
Fort Wayne Komets players
Hershey Bears players
Ice hockey people from Ontario
Muskegon Lumberjacks players
New Haven Nighthawks players
Ottawa Loggers players
Ottawa Senators players
People from Leeds and Grenville United Counties
Phoenix Roadrunners (IHL) players
Prince Edward Island Senators players
Undrafted National Hockey League players